Acemya tibialis is a species of bristle fly in the family Tachinidae discovered in 1897 by Daniel William Coquillett.

Distribution
The Acemya tibialis can be found in the Nearctic region of North America.

More specifically, in the areas listed below:

Canada
British Columbia
Eastern Canada
Ontario
The Prairies
The Yukon
United States
California
The Great Plains
Northeast USA
Northern Rockies
Pacific Northwest
Southwest USA
Texas

References

Exoristinae
Diptera of North America
Insects described in 1897
Taxa named by Daniel William Coquillett